The Cluster Pluckers are a quartet of harmony singer-songwriters and country music instrumentalists active since 1980. The original and remaining members are Margaret Bailey, Kris Ballinger and Dale Ballinger, later joined by Mark Howard.

In the spring of 1980, the trio of Margaret, Kris and Dale first sang together at a pickin' party. They were then joined by fiddler Frazier Moss.

They performed at the Folklife Festival Exhibition during the 1982 World's Fair in Knoxville, Tennessee.

In 1984 Kris and Dale performed with fiddler Junior Daughtery at Carnegie Hall as part of a special American Folk Roots Concert Series.

In 1986 Kris and Margaret sang vocal harmony with Vassar Clements' Hillbilly Jazz Band, on two of the group's albums and on national tour, then performed on The Nashville Network television shows "Nashville Now" and "New Country".

The television exposure introduced them to country legend Chet Atkins, with whom they then co-wrote the tongue-in-cheek song  "Would Jesus Wear a Rolex?" which became a minor hit for Ray Stevens, reaching No. 41 on the country chart in 1987, and was nominated for a Grammy Award.

In 1987 Mark Howard joined the trio. Howard is a multi-instrumentalist and recording artist who has been featured with many various country stars, for whom he has also done engineering and production work, as well as writing string arrangements for the Nashville Symphony and others.

The group has its own backup trio of bluegrass instrumentalists, humorously named "Them Other Pluckers", consisting of Brent Truitt on mandolin, Blaine Sprouse on fiddle and Richard Bailey on banjo, all of whom have toured and recorded with a wide range of bluegrass and country artists.

In 1989, they appeared on John Hartford's album Down on the River.

The Cluster Pluckers have recorded four albums on their own label, CPR (Cluster Plucker Records...Music Good for the Heart).

In 1991 they appeared on the PBS music television program Austin City Limits, along with Chet Atkins.

Other television appearances have included:

 American Music Shop, on The Nashville Network
 The Statler Brothers Easter Special, on The Nashville Network
 Reno's Old Time Music Festival, on the Americana Television Network
 A Cluster Plucker Christmas, on PBS, for three years
 Songs of the Civil War, on PBS, with Hoyt Axton, produced by Ken Burns

In 1995, their album Unplucked featured Johnny Cash on the song, "Where the Soul Never Dies."

On radio, the Cluster Pluckers have been featured on:

Rider's Radio Theater, on National Public Radio with Riders in the Sky

In the 1990s the group performed at a fundraiser event in front of President Clinton and Vice President Gore at the Opryland Hotel in Nashville, Tennessee, and also for Tipper Gore's Birthday Bash at the Ryman Auditorium in Nashville, Tennessee.

In recent years the group also tours and performs internationally.

Discography

 The Cluster Pluckers, (CPR)
 Just Pluck It! (CPR)
 Unplucked, (CPR, 1995)
 A Cluster Plucker Christmas Album (CPR)
 Old Time Gospel Favorites (Chapel Records)
 The All Nite Gang – Bluegrass From Nashville, (collaboration of Various Artists, Rebel Records)

References

American country music groups